The Mcdonald River, also known as the Macdonald River and locally as the Collett River, is a river located in Far North Queensland, Australia.

The headwaters of the river rise in the foothills of the Great Dividing Range on Cape York Peninsula. The river descends  over its  course.

See also

References

Rivers of Far North Queensland